Elections were held to fill the 65 seats of the New York City Board of Aldermen on November 5, 1935. They would be the final elections to the Board of Aldermen, which would be abolished in 1937 in favor of the New York City Council, which was elected via borough-wide proportional representation. 

Democrats gained 13 seats, recovering from Republican-Fusion advances in 1933 and allowing Republicans only three seats, two in Manhattan and one in Brooklyn. Thomas J. Curran of Manhattan was chosen as the minority leader.

References

New York City Council elections

1935 New York (state) elections
1935 United States local elections